Veliki Brat 2009 is the third season of the television reality show Veliki Brat, the Serbian, Bosnian, Montenegrin and Macedonian joint version of Big Brother. Macedonia joined the Veliki Brat for the first time, setting the record number of participating countries in Veliki Brat to four. The show started on 21 September 2009 and ended on 30 December 2009.

Production

Theme 
During the live launch, presenters said on more than one occasion that Big Brother will be two-faced. As a result of this Big Brother gave housemates many secret tasks, which sometimes meant stealing other housemates' items. During the diary-room interviews, Big Brother also pushed some of the housemates to their tipping points and didn't help them sort out their problems with other housemates or other sorts of issues they had.

Another example of Big Brother being two-faced is when the housemates had a chance to name two of the evicted housemates who'd they like to see back in the house, Big Brother moved one with the most votes (Danica), and one with the least (Tatjana). On one occasion there was even a fake eviction; the public voted who they want to fake evict, have interviewed and then move them back in the house. This housemate was Dragica. When she was interviewed she said nothing but the worst about the others in the house, what she didn't know was that the housemates hear and see all of this on the TV in the house.

The House 
In the lights of the credit crunch and the financial crisis, the house was purposely designed to look cheap. Most of the walls were covered in pipes, metal and plywood. There were also some misplaced bathtubs in the living room and the bedroom (some of the housemates used these as beds since the house had more housemates than sleeping places).

The bathroom was locked during the first week, so the housemates had to use one that was set outdoor, in the garden. There was also an outdoor shower, but with no hot water. The furniture was unavailable as well during the first week. Housemate sat on crates during this period. The first-week task prize was, besides the budget, winning the access to the bathroom, a crowbar and some house tools to open up the crates, and assemble the furniture which was in them.

Nominations
During Veliki Brat 3, nominations procedure was different from that of the previous years, in that the process was essentially reversed. Each week all housemates will face the public vote. The public voting for their favourite housemate. The voting closes on each Thursday. The three housemates that received the fewest votes will be nominated for eviction.

During the live eviction shows, the nominated housemates will face a house eviction vote to determine who will be evicted. Each housemate will vote on one of the nominated housemates they wanted to leave in the Diary Room. The housemate received the most votes is evicted the two housemates.

There were some variation in the rules:
 Weeks 2 and 3 had the previous nomination process (housemates nominate, and public voting to evict).
 Week 12 also used the previous nomination process, but for a fake eviction.
 Week 13 was a double eviction. The housemate with the fewest votes from the public was instantly evicted and the next two lowest vote recipients were nominated for a House eviction vote.
 Week 14 had the housemates vote for two of the nominees in the style of the old nomination system (3 Eviction Votes to be allocated in a 2/1 vote allocation).

Housemates 
12 housemates entered the house on launch night (Day 0), on 21 September 2009.

On 25 September (Day 4) Admir entered the house with a mission to periodically change with his twin brother, Enis, who entered the special intruder room. 

On 3 October (Day 12) Enis entered the house as a housemate.

On 5 October (Day 14), the birthday of Big Brother, Dragica and Đorđe entered the house as presents to Big Brother.

On 19 October (Day 28), Karlo was brought back to the show. Violeta previously wished to see him and her twin sister, Kristina. Big Brother allowed her to see Kristina. Karlo and Kristina were asked to stay in the secret room, with a mission that could allow them to enter the house. 

On 24 October (Day 33), Karlo and Kristina entered the house as temporary housemates. Only one of them was allowed to become a regular housemate. Violeta made that decision on October 26.

On 26 October (Day 35), Violeta decided to keep her sister, Kristina, but she was emotionally destroyed. After seeing that, Big Brother decided to keep Karlo in the house as well. Karlo and Kristina became regular housemates.

On 23 November (Day 63), housemates voted to enter two former female housemates. Danica and Indiana received the highest number of votes. After drawing a bigger card as a tie-breaker, Danica entered the house. Tatjana also entered the house, having received the fewest votes. The new housemate, Mirjana, also entered the house.

Out of 18 total housemates, 10 were from Serbia, 4 from Bosnia and Herzegovina, 2 from Montenegro and 2 from the Republic of Macedonia.

Nominations table

Notes
Big Brother cancelled nominations in the first week and showed them to all housemates. Instead, the audience decided on the nominees while the housemates chose which of the nominees was evicted. The table lists nominations of housemates after the audience's votes. If nominations had not been cancelled, Radiša (6 votes), Manuel (3 votes), Milan (3 votes) and Sandra (3 votes) would have been nominated. Instead, Indiana and Karlo were nominated and Karlo was evicted after a close vote (6-5)
Admir could not be nominated this week due to being a new housemate. Since Enis was in the house at the time of nominations, he voted instead of Admir.
Due to the continuous breaking of the Big Brother rules, Violeta and Jovana are nominated this week and exempt from voting. Manuel refused to vote, resulting in all housemates being nominated, except himself and new housemates Dragica and Đorđe.
This week, Big Brother decided that there will be no nominations and the public will vote for their favorite housemate. Two housemates with the lowest number of votes will be nominated and the housemates will vote for eviction of one of them. The concept is identical to week 1 nominations.
Week 5 follows the same nominations concept as weeks 1 and 4.
Week 6 follows the same nominations concept as weeks 1, 4 and 5. Kristina was not exempt from voting even though she was the new housemate this week.
Week 7 follows the same nominations concept as previous 3 weeks.
Week 8 eviction was cancelled due to the days of mourning in Serbia following the death of Serbian Patriarch Pavle.
There was no eviction this week. Instead, 2 former and 1 new housemate entered the house.
Mirjana, Danica and Tatjana as new and returning housemates were exempt from nominations. The nomination procedure was the same as in most of the previous weeks.
The nomination procedure was the same as in most of the previous weeks.
The housemates nominated to evict (like in Week 2 & 3), however, the nominations were fake and the eviction would be fake. The public voted for whom to fake evict; Dragica was fake evicted, interviewed by the host, as the housemates watched from the house, and brought back into the house.
Kristina was evicted after receiving the fewest audience votes. The next two housemates with the fewest votes were nominated for eviction.

External links
Veliki Brat official website (Serbian)
Production website (English)

2009 Serbian television seasons
2009